The Kintrishi is a river in the Autonomous Republic of Adjara in southwestern Georgia. 

It flows through the municipality Kobuleti. It flows initially in a westerly direction through the mountains. North of the river is the Kintrishi National Park, south of the Mtirala National Park. The Kintrishi passes the village of Chino and takes on the left tributary of Cherkena. The river then turns north and cuts through a mountain range. Later it turns west again. In the coastal plain it still takes on the Kinkischa on the left side and finally reached on the southern outskirts of Kobuleti by a spit almost completely separated from the Black Sea estuary, in which also flows from the southeast inflowing Dechwa.
Settlements in order from the source: 
Kvirike 
Khutsubani 
Kohi 
Chahati

References

External links

Rivers of Georgia (country)
Tributaries of the Black Sea